Néstor Manfredi (born 22 August 1942) is an Argentine former footballer who competed in the 1964 Summer Olympics.

Career
He played one season for the New York Generals of the National Professional Soccer League. In 1968, manager Ángel Tulio Zof brought Manfredi to Club Atlético Los Andes. He spent four seasons with Los Andes, helping the club to a best-ever eighth place finish in the 1968 Primera División.

After he retired from playing, Manfredi became a football coach. He led Gimnasia y Esgrima de Jujuy during 1999.

References

1942 births
Living people
Association football forwards
Argentine footballers
Olympic footballers of Argentina
Footballers at the 1964 Summer Olympics
Rosario Central footballers
Club Atlético Colón footballers
Club Atlético Los Andes footballers
Argentine football managers
Gimnasia y Esgrima de Jujuy managers
Atlético Junior managers
New York Generals (NPSL) players
National Professional Soccer League (1967) players
Pan American Games medalists in football
Pan American Games silver medalists for Argentina
Footballers at the 1963 Pan American Games
Medalists at the 1963 Pan American Games